The thirteenth season of The Real Housewives of New York City, an American reality television series, is broadcast on Bravo. It premiered on May 4, 2021. The series is primarily filmed in New York City. Its executive producers are Lisa Shannon, Barrie Bernstein, Darren Ward, John Paparazzo, and Andy Cohen. The season focuses on the lives of Luann de Lesseps, Ramona Singer, Sonja Morgan, Leah McSweeney and Eboni K. Williams.

Following a very poorly received season, it was announced in September 2021 that a reunion for the season will not take place. This marks the first time in the history of The Real Housewives franchise that a US series will not be followed up with a reunion special. Bravo stated "Due to scheduling challenges around taping the reunion of 'The Real Housewives of New York City' in a timely manner. It's disappointing to not be able to bring the cast back together, but we are happy to have ended on such a high note with the finale, and are now shifting our focus to next season."

This was the final season for the entire cast.

Cast and synopsis
In June 2020, Tinsley Mortimer announced her departure from the series and her relocation to Chicago to continue her relationship with her fiancé, Scott Kluth. In August 2020, Dorinda Medley announced her departure from the series and two months later revealed that she was fired from the series.

In October 2020, it was announced that Eboni K. Williams would join the series as the first black housewife. Bershan Shaw and former housewife, Heather Thomson, come onto the series as friends of the housewives.

In October 2020, production on the series halted after a crew member tested positive for COVID-19. In January 2021, it was announced production on the series had halted again after an undisclosed cast member had tested positive for the virus.

Episodes

References

External links
 

2021 American television seasons
New York City (season 13)